The Rognacian Formation is a geologic formation in France. It is of Maastrichtian age.  The mammal Valentinella is known from the formation, alongside indeterminate dinosaur remains.

Geological Setting 
The Upper Cretaceous continental deposits in southern France are distributed from the east province to the west. The solid fragmented materials are characteristic of flood plain environments, with special deposits. There are alternating beds of fluvial channels and paleosols.

See also

 List of fossiliferous stratigraphic units in France

References

 
 Garcia, G. & Vianey-Liaud, M. 2001, "Dinosaur eggshells as biochronological markers in Upper Cretaceous continental deposits", Palaeogeography, Palaeoclimatology, Palaeoecology, vol. 169, no. 1, pp. 153–164

Cretaceous France
Upper Cretaceous Series of Europe